Barbara May Theresa Werle (October 6, 1928 – January 1, 2013) was an American actress, dancer and singer, best known for her role in Seconds (1966).

Career
Werle was born on October 6, 1928, in Mount Vernon, New York. She became a ballroom dancer after graduating from high school, winning the acclaimed Harvest Moon Ball in the early 1950s. As part of the dance team Barbara and Mansell, she toured the U.S.

On television, Werle had the role of June on San Francisco International Airport (1970–1971). Her other television credits included appearances on The Ed Sullivan Show and recurring roles on the NBC television series, The Virginian, during the 1960s and 1970s.

Werle's film credits included the Elvis Presley films Tickle Me, Harum Scarum (1965) and Charro! (1969); Battle of the Bulge (1965), The Rare Breed (1966), Gunfight in Abilene (1967), Krakatoa, East of Java (1969), and Gone with the West (1974).

Retirement
She retired to La Costa, California. She sang as a soprano for the local St. Elizabeth Seton Traditional Choir from 2000 until 2012. Her children include entertainment lawyer John Gregory Branca.

Death
Werle died at age 84 on January 1, 2013, from undisclosed causes, at Carlsbad, California.

Filmography

References

External links
 
 

1928 births
2013 deaths
American film actresses
American television actresses
People from Carlsbad, California
Musicians from Mount Vernon, New York
Actresses from New York (state)
20th-century American actresses
20th-century American singers
21st-century American singers
Singers from California
Singers from New York (state)
20th-century American women singers
Actors from Mount Vernon, New York
21st-century American women singers